Mark David Madoff (March 11, 1964 – December 11, 2010) was an American financier who exposed the multi-billion dollar Ponzi scheme committed by his father, Bernie Madoff.

Personal life 
Madoff was born and raised on Long Island, New York, the elder of Bernard and Ruth Madoff's two sons. He earned a bachelor's degree in economics from the University of Michigan in 1986. He joined the Sigma Alpha Mu fraternity there. He married his college girlfriend, Susan Elkin, and moved to Greenwich, Connecticut, where they raised two children. They divorced in 2000, and he eventually moved back to Manhattan. In 2003, he married Stephanie Mikesell, with whom he had two children, born in 2006 and 2008.

Career 
Madoff joined his father's company in 1987. He and his brother, Andrew Madoff (1966–2014), worked in the firm's legitimate market-making and proprietary trading arm.

Ponzi scheme scandal 
In December 2008, Mark and his brother confronted their father over his plans to distribute hundreds of millions of dollars in bonuses to employees months ahead of schedule. The elder Madoff then confessed to them that his business was based on a "big lie", a long-running Ponzi scheme that was collapsing under the global financial crisis. He asked them to give him 24 hours to get his affairs in order, before going to the authorities. The brothers went to the authorities immediately on the advice of their lawyers. However, Bernard Madoff was arrested the next day. They never spoke with him again.

While no criminal charges were filed against Mark Madoff, the scandal and its aftermath proved devastating to his personal and professional life. Mark, his mother and his brother were all the subject of constant media attention, with articles speculating that they had been involved in their father's crime, or at least were aware of it. He also found it extremely difficult to find employment.

Death and aftermath 
On December 11, 2010, Madoff was found dead in his Manhattan apartment at 158 Mercer Street.  With a dog leash tied to a beam, he had hanged himself from the ceiling. His suicide occurred on the second anniversary of his father's arrest.

Madoff's estate amounted to $18.6 million. In 2012, his ex-wife, Susan Elkin, and widow, Stephanie Mack, were sued by Irving Picard, the trustee for his father's swindled clients, under a claim they should have known their wealth was based on crime.

References 

1964 births
2010 deaths
2010 suicides
American financiers
Madoff family
Suicides by hanging in New York City
People from Long Island
University of Michigan alumni
20th-century American Jews
21st-century American Jews